The bellowfishes or bellowsfishes are fishes in the genus Notopogon in the family Centriscidae. They are found in deeper parts of the temperate southern oceans, although the longspine bellowfish has been recorded as far north as New Caledonia and Madagascar. According to FishBase, they are part of the family Centriscidae, but some authorities split that family, in which case the genus Notopogon is in the family Macroramphosidae, which is followed here. They have long second spines on their dorsal fins and tiny mouths at the tip of their greatly elongated snouts. Their bodies are relatively high (giving them a somewhat hunchbacked appearance), unlike the related snipefishes.

Species
The currently recognized species in this genus are:
 Notopogon armatus (Sauvage, 1879)
 Notopogon fernandezianus (Delfín, 1899) (orange bellowsfish)
 Notopogon lilliei Regan, 1914 (crested bellowsfish)
 Notopogon macrosolen Barnard, 1925 (longsnout bellowsfish)
 Notopogon xenosoma Regan, 1914 (longspine bellowsfish)

References

 
Marine fish genera
Taxa named by Charles Tate Regan